Dr. Hart's Diary (German: Das Tagebuch des Dr. Hart) is a 1917 German silent war film directed by Paul Leni and starring Heinrich Schroth, Käthe Haack and Dagny Servaes. The film depicts a German field hospital in occupied Russian Poland during the ongoing First World War.

The film was created as part of a major effort to propagandize the German-Polish friendship that leads to the re-establishment of Poland by German forces in late 1916. It was produced by Paul Davidson's PAGU in association with the propaganda agency BUFA. Shortly afterwards, hoping to produce a number of similar films, the German government founded UFA which PAGU merged into.

Cast
 Heinrich Schroth as Dr. Robert Hart 
 Käthe Haack as Schlossherrin Ursula von Hohenau 
 Dagny Servaes as Jadwiga Bransky 
 Ernst Hofmann as Graf Bronislaw Krascinsky 
 Adolf Klein as Graf Bransky

References

Bibliography
 Prawer, S.S. Between Two Worlds: The Jewish Presence in German and Austrian Film, 1910-1933. Berghahn Books, 2005.

External links

1917 films
1910s German-language films
Films of the German Empire
German war films
1917 war films
Films directed by Paul Leni
Films set in Poland
German World War I films
German silent feature films
German black-and-white films
1910s German films